are a fox grape (Concord-like) cross popular in East Asia. The fruits are blackish-purple, or almost black, with large seeds and juicy flesh with high sugar content and mild acidity. The variety was first produced by the Japanese viniculturist Yasushi Ohinoue in the 1930s and 1940s by crossing Ishiharawase and Centennial grape varieties (Vitis vinifera × Vitis labrusca). Kyoho is a tetraploid grape variety, as its breeding parents, ‘Ishiharawase’ and ‘Centennial’ are tetraploid bud sports of ‘Campbell Early’ (V. labruscana) and ‘Rosaki’ (V. vinifera), respectively. Like the Concord, Kyoho is a slip-skin variety, meaning that the skin is easily separated from the fruit. The seeds are bitter and the skin is not traditionally eaten. The grape maintains some of the flavor qualities of the Concord, known to consumers from the flavor of most grape jellies and Concord grape juice.

Kyoho grapes were first produced in 1937 in Shizuoka Prefecture, but were not given their present name until 1946. They are popular in Japan, Taiwan, mainland China, and Korea for their size and very sweet flesh. They are traditionally served peeled as a dessert, and the juice is used in making chūhai cocktails. Areas of production include Nagano Prefecture, Yamanashi Prefecture, California's Central Valley, Changhua County in Taiwan, and Chile.

As of 2015, Kyoho was the world's most cultivated grape variety by land area (365000ha). More than 90% of these vines are in China.

References

External links
Produce Hunter Kyoho information page
Specialty Produce Kyoho information page 

Hybrid grape varieties
Japanese fruit
Table grape varieties